Upper Sargent Pond is located west of Blue Mountain Lake, New York. Fish species present in the lake are brook trout, white sucker, smallmouth bass, black bullhead, yellow perch, and sunfish. There is access by trail off North Point Road, 6 miles west of Deerland, New York.

References

Lakes of New York (state)
Lakes of Hamilton County, New York